New Bataan, officially the Municipality of New Bataan, is a 1st class municipality in the province of Davao de Oro, Philippines. According to the 2020 census, it has a population of 51,466 people. Geraldford N. Balbin has been its mayor since July 2016.

The municipality was founded on 18 June 1968, through Republic Act No. 4756. According to the 2020 census, it has a population of 51,466 people.

The town's festivals include Araw Celebration, held annually on 18 June; Founder's Day, held every 10 August; Sal’lupongan Festival, held every 13 June. Its patron saint is Saint Anthony of Padua.

The municipality was one of the hardest-hit towns of Typhoon Pablo when it hit the town on 4 December 2012.

The town got its name from the migrants coming from the Province of Bataan who settled in the town either during the Commonwealth or Post-War Period.

Geography
It is surrounded by mountain ranges, with over 50% of its territory being forest cover that has been the source of livelihood for some people living there. The barangays of New Bataan that are mostly covered with forest are Andap, Tandawan, Camanlangan, Manurigao. Manurigao is the most remote among the barangay because of the absence of a better road and transportation.

The municipality is also watered by various rivers. One of which is the Mayo River that flows from the mountain of Andap and empties into the Agusan River. The Batoto river is also one of the biggest, it flows from the eastern part of the area. The northeastern portion of the municipality forms part on the contiguous plain of Compostela valley.

Climate

Land classification
Forest: 
Agro-forest: 
Agricultural: 
Mining: 
Residential: 
Brush land: 
Commercial: 
Road: 
Institutional: 
Special use: 
Industrial: 
Rivers/canals:

Barangays
New Bataan is politically divided into 16 barangays, further subdivided into 204 puroks.

Demographics

Birth rate (crude): 28.82 (2005)
Death rate (crude): 4.12 (2005)

Economy

Annual local income: P5,761,257.97 (2005)
Internal revenue allotment:  P52,636,316 (2005)

Major crops
 Coconut
 Rice
 Corn
 Banana
 Coffee/Cacao
 Abaca/Bamboo

Transportation
Road network (within the LGU territory):
 National road: 
 Provincial road: 
 Municipal road:

References

External links
 New Bataan Profile at the DTI Cities and Municipalities Competitive Index

 [ Philippine Standard Geographic Code]
Philippine Census Information

Municipalities of Davao de Oro